This is a list of cattle breeds considered in Brazil to be wholly or partly of Brazilian origin. Some may have complex or obscure histories, so inclusion here does not necessarily imply that a breed is predominantly or exclusively Brazilian.

References 

 
Livestock
Lists of Brazilian domestic animal breeds